Ring may refer to:

 Ring (jewellery), a round band, usually made of metal, worn as ornamental jewelry
 To make a sound with a bell, and the sound made by a bell
(hence) to initiate a telephone connection

Arts, entertainment and media

Film and literature
 The Ring (franchise), a Japanese horror media franchise based on the novel series by Koji Suzuki
 Ring (novel series)
 Ring (Suzuki novel), 1991
 Ring (film), or The Ring, a 1998 Japanese horror film by Hideo Nakata
 The Ring (2002 film), an American horror film, remake of the 1998 Japanese film
 Ring (1995 film), a TV film
 Rings (2005 film), a short film  by Jonathan Liebesman
 Rings (2017 film), an American horror film
 Ring (Baxter novel), a 1994 science fiction novel
 Ring (Alexis novel), a 2021 Canadian novel by André Alexis

Gaming
 Ring (video game), 1998
 Ring Rage,  a belt-scrolling professional wrestling game developed and released by Taito for arcades (using Taito F3 System hardware) in 1992 and then ported to the Game Boy in 1998 by Natsume
 Rings (Sonic the Hedgehog), a collectible in Sonic the Hedgehog games

Music
 Ring (rock band), a 1980s British band
 Der Ring des Nibelungen, Wagner's epic "Ring cycle"

Albums
 Ring (The Connells album), 1993
 Ring (Gary Burton album), 1974
 Ring (Glasser album), 2010
 Ring (Miliyah Kato album), 2009
 Ring (R album), 2020
 Ring (White Reaper song), 2019

Songs
 "Ring" (B'z song), 2000
 "Ring" (Cardi B song), 2018
 "Ring", song by Phoebe Ryan, 2020
 "Ring" (Selena Gomez song), 2020
 "Ring" (T.I. song), 2020
 "Rings" (song), 1971 song covered by Lonnie Mack, Cymarron, Tompall & the Glaser Brothers, and others
 "Rings" (Aesop Rock song), 2016

People
 Ring (surname), including a list of people with the name
 Ring of Sweden, a Swedish monarch or local ruler c. 936

Places
 Ring, County Waterford, Ireland
 Ring, Wisconsin, United States

Mathematics
 Ring (mathematics), an algebraic structure
 Ring of sets, a family of subsets closed under certain operations
 Annulus (mathematics), a geometric planar ring
 Torus, a three-dimensional surface
 Solid torus, a solid figure
 Napkin ring problem, on the volume left after drilling a cylindrical hole through a sphere

Computers and electronics 
 Ring (data structure), or ring buffer
 Ring network, a network topology
 Protection ring, in computer security
 Ring (software), VOIP software
 Ring circuit, an electrical wiring technique

Science 
 Ring (chemistry), a cyclic molecule
 Ring system, in astronomy, matter orbiting a planet or other stellar body
 Annulus (mycology), or ring, on the stipe of mushrooms
 Ring attached to a bird by bird ringing, for identification

Sports
 Boxing ring, the space in which a boxing match occurs
 Wrestling ring, the stage on which a professional wrestling match usually occurs
 Rings (gymnastics), a gymnastics apparatus and its associated event
 Fighting Network Rings, or RINGS, a Japanese combat sport promotion
 Juggling ring, a popular prop used by jugglers

Other uses
 Ring (Bulgaria), a Bulgarian sports TV channel
 Ring (company), a home security company, maker of the Ring video doorbell
 Ring (diacritic), that may appear above or below letters
 a bidders' pool for collusion in an auction
 a local clubs of the International Brotherhood of Magicians
 a perception of sound caused by tinnitus
 Ring languages, spoken in Cameroon
 Ring road, a type of highway encircling a town or city
 Crime ring, or ring, in organized crime

See also
 
 
 Ringe (disambiguation)
 Ringer (disambiguation)
 Ringing (disambiguation)
 Ringo (disambiguation)
 Ringtone (disambiguation)
 The Ring (disambiguation)
 Ring 0 (disambiguation)
 Ring 1 (disambiguation)
 Ring 2 (disambiguation)
 Ring 3 (disambiguation)
 Ring 4 (disambiguation)
 Ring 5 (disambiguation)
 Ring of Honor (disambiguation)
 Ring Ring (disambiguation)
 Ring Ring Ring (disambiguation)
 Ring Road (disambiguation)
 Ring structure (disambiguation)
 Annulus (disambiguation)
 Brass ring, a grabbable ring on a carousel 
 Cock ring, a ring worn around the penis
 Circle symbol (disambiguation)
 Coffee ring effect
 D-ring, a D-shaped metal ring
 Piston ring, part of an engine
 Ring of bells, a set of bells hung for English full circle ringing
 Storage ring, a type of particle accelerator
 Torus, a doughnut shape